Obscuranella is a genus of predatory sea snails, marine gastropod mollusks in the family Ranellidae, the triton snails, triton shells or tritons.

Species
Species within the genus Obscuranella include:

 Obscuranella papyrodes Kantor & Harasewych, 2000

References

Ranellidae
Monotypic gastropod genera